Orcs Must Die! Unchained is the third installment in the Orcs Must Die! franchise from Robot Entertainment, available for Microsoft Windows and PlayStation 4. Unchained was initially released as a beta version in 2014, and in its release form on April 18, 2017 for the Windows platform, while the PlayStation 4 version was released on July 18, 2017.

As with the previous titles, Unchained is a variation on tower defense games, where the player places traps within the game's levels and engages in direct combat with a selected hero characters to ward off several waves of orcs and other monsters from reaching a magic core. While the game was available to purchase during its beta period, Unchained was released as a free-to-play title with a meta-game for players to earn in-game currency and upgrades through successful matches to improve traps and acquire other items and attributes to support their character, or which they can buy directly using real world money. The game includes co-operative matches for up to three players against AI opponents, and a competitive mode between two teams of three, competing on separate instances of the map but with the ability to affect the other team's performance; the game previously featured a competitive, 5v5 player-versus-player mode named Siege that was dropped during the beta phase.

Robot Entertainment shut down the game's servers in April 2019, after running the game at a financial loss for several months, making the game no longer playable without third-party modifications.

Gameplay 
Unchained follows the general hybrid gameplay of tower defense and action games used in the series' previous titles. Players use a combination of direct attacks and numerous traps to prevent hordes of monsters from reaching a core. In open beta, the game was divided between its cooperative Survival mode, and its competitive Siege mode. Since its December 2016 update, the Siege mode has been dropped from the game entirely. Upon its full release, Orcs Must Die! Unchained included a new head-to-head mode called Sabotage.

Survival mode 
In the game's Survival mode, players work cooperatively to fend off several waves of orcs and other monsters from reaching a magic core; those that do reach it reduce the core's health by one point, and if the core loses all its points (typically starting with 25), the match is over as a loss to the players.

To stop the monsters, players use a variety of traps and other objects that they can place in the corridors leading from the entrance point to the core that damage the monsters, as well as traps that are pre-built in the level, such as a trap that when triggered releases a large boulder down stairs. Furthermore, players have various combat abilities that they can engage directly with the monsters which will depend on which hero they have selected: a basic attack and three special attacks or moves that consume mana and require a cool-down period before they can be reused. Players will take damage from monsters attacks, and should they deplete their health, the player's character will momentarily be taken out of combat and respawn near the core.

Prior to the match, the player can construct a "deck" of traps and other placeable items, as well as Guardians, computer-controlled allies that can defend marked points on a map, single-use items that can restore health or mana or provide buffs for the player or team, and traits that provide attribute improvements in specific situations such as dealing more damage to monsters of specific types. Decks can only contain a limited number of these items. When starting a match, each player selects one of the game's heroes, either from a rotating roster of free heroes available or from heroes that they have crafted or bought; each player must select a different hero. Then they can select one of their pre-made decks to complement the abilities of that hero.

A match is broken up into various waves of monsters, with the goal to survive a fixed number of waves. As waves progress the difficulty increases, typically with more monsters spawning in, more powerful monsters among their number, or monsters spawning in from additional points on the level and forcing players to split up to handle the mobs. Furthermore, some waves will randomly generate a mini-boss monster or a computer-controlled hero that will attack the players. Most waves proceed automatically to the next wave after a few seconds following completion, but some waves will give the players a chance to set up traps, heal, and other activities and only progressing once all players are ready or after a fixed time period.

Placing traps requires earning in-game money during a match. Players automatically start with some money and will gain some money over time, but most money will come from killing monsters through attacks and their traps. Traps can also be sold at a reduced cost. Players can place as many traps of the type they have equipped in their deck as they can afford. Alternatively, players can freely place Guardians on the map, but Guardians can only be used once and if they fall in battle, they cannot be reused again.

As the player earns money and points for killing monsters, they gain experience levels within the match, starting at Level 1 and up to Level 12. Level gains increase the health and mana capacity and base attack values for the player's hero, and every three levels, the player can select one of three beneficial traits to give to their hero for the duration of that match. Further, as the player's score increases, they fill an "Unchained" meter. Once this meter is full, the player can activate it at any time to briefly enter a powered-up state where their attacks do more damage, and regain their mana and skill cooldowns at a much-faster rate, making them more effective in battle.

During the match, monsters may drop loot that is used for crafting of new traps and other items in the metagame. Successfully surviving all the ways gains additional rewards, including Skulls, the in-game currency used for purchases and crafting. The selected hero will also gain experience towards their overall hero level, with each level reached gaining further rewards to the player and boosting their overall player level.

Siege mode 
Siege mode was based on a typical multiplayer online battle arena, played by two teams of up to five players each, with each player on a team required to have a unique hero. In addition to guardians, traps, and other cards that players select for their deck as in survival mode, players also could add up to eight minion cards, representing four different levels of hordes of creatures that are summoned over the course of the game.  Siege maps were symmetric, with each side having a single magic core location, one or more summoning portals, control points to summon boss monsters against the opposing team, as well as hallways and locations they control to place guardians and traps. Robot Entertainment announced in September 2016 that it plans to eliminate Siege mode as to focus the game on the Survival mode, though states that a "player versus player" mode may come back in the future. This mode was removed in the game's December 2016 patch.

Sabotage mode
In its first non-beta release, Unchained introduced Sabotage mode. Here, players compete as two teams of three, each team playing on their own instance of the same map with the same waves of orcs and other creatures slated against both teams. Special consumables are earned in this mode that allow players on each team to cause some type of disruption to the other team, such as summoning a tougher creature or boss or casting a spell that interferes with their traps. The team that survives the most waves wins the match.

Metagame 
Players earn their traps, gear, and Skulls (the in-game soft currency) from loot-filled chests after winning matches. Traps can be upgraded further using the upgrade system to increase their power. Players can also spend real money through microtransactions to pay for these items and improvements. Outside of matches, players can construct the various decks for Survival and Sabotage mode. Some items can only be equipped in one of these modes, so decks are tailored to the specific game type.

Plot 
Despite being the third installment in the Orcs Must Die! franchise, the game is considered non-canon in the storyline of the following game, Orcs Must Die! 3.

Reception 

Orcs Must Die! Unchained received "generally positive" reviews, according to review aggregator Metacritic.

Chandler Wood of PlayStation LifeStyle rated the PS4 port an 8 out of 10, praising its balanced free-to-play experience, mix of action and tower defense gameplay, and indirect versus mode while criticizing menus unoptimized for console and subpar quick communications functions.

Shutdown 
Robot Entertainment announced in January 2019 that it planned to shut down the game's servers on April 9, 2019. The company had been running Unchained at a financial loss for several months, and with two new games in the works, decided to make the decision to close down its servers. The game can still be played via an offline mod from a dedicated modding community.  Players were given a hefty boost of in-game currency after the announcement as to be able to enjoy the title until its planned shutdown.

References

External links 

2017 video games
Early access video games
Fantasy video games
Free-to-play video games
Multiplayer and single-player video games
PlayStation 4 games
Tower defense video games
Video game sequels
Video games developed in the United States
Video games featuring female protagonists
Windows games
Orcs in popular culture
Robot Entertainment games